The Caribbean and Pacific Consortium (CariPac), established 2005, consists of institutions of higher education in Guam, the Northern Mariana Islands, American Samoa, Puerto Rico, the U.S. Virgin Islands, the Federated States of Micronesia, the Marshall Islands, and Palau. CariPac was established to bring needed funds into agriculture and food science programs. Congressional response has included added telemetry for food science missions.

External links
  Virtual Classroom to Span Half the Globe with New Money for Distance Education

Higher education
Education in Guam
Education in American Samoa
Education in Puerto Rico
Education in the United States Virgin Islands
Education in Palau
Education in the Northern Mariana Islands
Education in the Federated States of Micronesia
Education in the Marshall Islands
2005 establishments in the United States
2000s establishments in the Caribbean
2005 establishments in Oceania